Bumboo is a 2012 Bollywood black comedy film directed by Jagdish Rajpurohit.  Bumboo is based on an original play/film L'emmerdeur written by Francis Veber.The film stars Sharat Saxena, Sanjay Mishra, Kavin Dave and Mandy Takhar in lead roles and was released on 30 March 2012.

Plot
Professional hitman Mangal Singh takes a contract to kill stock market scammer Manu Gupta in front of the Goa High Court where he is to stand on trial. Mangal Singh plans to do the job from a hotel room which is opposite to the court.
Suresh Sudhakar, a press photographer is sent to Goa to cover Manu Gupta's trial and checks-in at the same hotel next to Mangal Singhs room.
Sudhakar tries to meet his ex-wife Pinky who is living in Goa. Pinky refuses to meetup or even talk and confers with her new boyfriend Dr D'Souza. Sudhakar threatens Pinky that he might commit suicide, but she does not believe him.
A depressed Sudhakar tries to commit suicide by hanging from the bathroom shower but fails. Bellboy Vincent (who is in Mangal Singh's room at that moment) hears the ruckus and opens the connecting-door between Mangal Singh & Sudhakar's room precipitating all characters to interact with each other.
Mangal Singh scared that cops might come to the room, assures Vincent that he will take care of Sudhakar. Assured by this promise Vincent leaves Sudhakar in the care of Mangal. Sudhakar in the meanwhile assumes that Mangal is a truly good Samaritan and taking fancy for his friendship does not let Mangal go anywhere or let him do his job.
Pinky's boyfriend Dr D'Souza (a psychiatrist) comes to the hotel to counsel Sudhakar not to commit suicide, but ends up meeting Mangal & mistakes him to be Sudhakar and gives him a sedative, preventing him from performing any work. Completely baffled by this turn of events, Mangal forces Sudhakar to call the Dr back who now comes with Pinky and wakes Mangal up but not before Pinky and Sudhakar have a conversation. This distresses the Dr.

Pinky has a major showdown with both Dr D'Souza and Sudhakar and leaves only to return and speak again to Sudhakar and convince him to go away.
During the course of the story Manu Gupta's entourage can be seen, travelling from Bombay to Goa in a police van disguised as a milk van with a group of commandos in it.

Manu Gupta finally reaches Goa but before he can be shot by Mangal, tremendous ruckus follows in the room where Mangal, Sudhakar, a cop and others fight it out and end up dangling from the hotel while a shot is accidentally fired from Mangal's gun and hits Manu Gupta's behind. Despite this, Manu Gupta reaches the court and gives his witness account. Mangal Singh retires to an Ashram due to the shock of forced friendship thrust upon him. Sudhakar gets Pinky back.

Cast
 Kavin Dave as Suresh Sudhakar
 Sharat Saxena as Mangal Singh
 Sanjay Mishra as Vincent Gomes
 Sudhir Pandey as Manu Gupta
 Sumit Kaul as Dr. Brendon D’souza
 Mandy Takhar as Pinky
 Jagdish Rajpurohit as Sultubhai
 Sariika Singh as Lata

Soundtrack

The soundtrack of Bumboo consists of five songs composed by Santokh Singh and Faiz-Ur-Rehman the lyrics of which were written by Shadab Akhtar and Nadeem Asad.

Release
Bumboo was released on 30 Mar 2012.

Critical Reception

The Times of India gave the film a rating of 3 out of 5 saying that, "As sniper Mangal, Sharat Saxena mostly holds it together, the film showing a few bright flashes, but then slipping into low-brow comedy that's so self-consciously 'thay-ter' (theater)." Sudhish Kamath of The Hindu said that, "A wannabe Bheja Fry, this crass, scatalogical humour-infested stagey remake is just about funny enough to make you source out the French original L'emmerdeur (“ A Pain in the Ass”)." Taran Adarsh of Bollywood Hungama gave the film a rating of 1.5 out of 5 and said that, "On the whole, BUMBOO tries too hard to be funny and that’s why it misfires. Besides, a weak script, abrupt conclusion and bizarre characters only go against it!" Rohit Vats of News18 gave the film a rating of 1.5 out of 5 and said that, "'Bumboo' is a film made with good intentions but somehow the makers couldn't transform the original idea onto the celluloid." Shubhra Gupta of The Indian Express gave the film a rating of 1 out of 5 saying that, "This may have been a good idea in the original. In the copy, an official Indo-French collaboration, it turns out to be non-stop bilge."

References

External links 

2012 films
2010s Hindi-language films
Films about contract killing in India
Indian remakes of French films
Indian black comedy films
2012 black comedy films